1 series or 1-series may refer to:

 BMW 1 Series, a car series
 IBM Series/1, a minicomputer series
 Nikon 1 series, a camera series

See also
 0 series (disambiguation)

 7 series (disambiguation)
 I series (disambiguation)
 L series (disambiguation)